Coleophora heihensis is a moth of the family Coleophoridae. It is found in China.

The wingspan is 16.5-17.5 mm.

References

heihensis
Moths described in 1999
Moths of Asia